Pachyiulus is a genus of julid millipedes containing the following species:

Pachyiulus apfelbecki Verhoeff, 1901
Pachyiulus asiaeminoris (Verhoeff, 1898)
Pachyiulus brussensis Verhoeff, 1941
Pachyiulus cattarensis (Latzel, 1884)
Pachyiulus communis Savi, 1817
Pachyiulus dentiger Verhoeff, 1901
Pachyiulus flavipes (Koch, C. L., 1847)
Pachyiulus humicola Verhoeff, 1910
Pachyiulus hungaricus (Karsch, 1881)
Pachyiulus krivolutskyi Golovatch, 1977
Pachyiulus lobifer Attems, 1939
Pachyiulus marmoratus Verhoeff, 1901
Pachyiulus oenologus (Berlese, 1886)
Pachyiulus silvestrii Verhoeff, 1923
Pachyiulus speciosus Verhoeff, 1901
Pachyiulus valonensis Verhoeff, 1901
Pachyiulus varius (Fabricius, 1781)

References

Further reading

Julida